Sergei Valentinovich Stepanov (born 3 February 1976) is a former Russian professional footballer.

Club career
He made his debut in the Russian Premier League in 2001 for FC Torpedo-ZIL Moscow.

References

External links
 
 

1976 births
Living people
Russian footballers
Association football midfielders
Russian Premier League players
Russian expatriate footballers
Expatriate footballers in Belarus
FC Zvezda Irkutsk players
FC Moscow players
FC Naftan Novopolotsk players
FC Dynamo Saint Petersburg players
FC Spartak Nizhny Novgorod players